The Japanese skylark (Alauda arvensis japonica) is a subspecies of Eurasian skylark. Formerly, combined with five other subspecies of the Eurasian skylark, it was considered to be its own separate species (as Alauda japonica).

References

Alauda
Birds described in 1848
Taxonomy articles created by Polbot